The Kingdom of Iraq under British Administration, or Mandatory Iraq, was created in 1921, following the 1920 Iraqi Revolt against the proposed British Mandate of Mesopotamia, and enacted via the 1922 Anglo-Iraqi Treaty and a 1924 undertaking by the United Kingdom to the League of Nations to fulfil the role as Mandatory Power.

Faisal ibn Husayn, who had been proclaimed King of Syria by a Syrian National Congress in Damascus in March 1920, was ejected by the French in July of the same year. Faisal was then granted by the British the territory of Iraq, to rule it as a kingdom, with the British Royal Air Force (RAF) retaining certain military control, but de facto, the territory remained under British administration until 1932.

The civil government of postwar Iraq was headed originally by the High Commissioner, Sir Percy Cox, and his deputy, Colonel Arnold Wilson. British reprisals after the murder of a British officer in Najaf failed to restore order. The most striking problem facing the British was the growing anger of the nationalists, who continued to fight against the imposition of British authority. British administration had yet to be established in Iraqi Kurdistan.

History

Early unrest

Three important anticolonial secret societies had been formed in Iraq during 1918 and 1919. The League of the Islamic Awakening (Jam'iyya an-naḥda al-islāmiyya) was organized at Najaf. The Muslim National League (al-Jam'iyya al-waṭaniyya al-islāmiyya) was formed with the object of organizing and mobilizing the population for major resistance. In February 1919, in Baghdad, a coalition of Shia merchants, Sunni teachers, and civil servants, Sunni and Shia ulama, and Iraqi officers formed the Guardians of Independence (Harās al-istiqlāl). The Istiqlal had member groups in Karbala, Najaf, Kut, and Hillah.

The Grand Mujtahid of Karbala, Imam Shirazi, and his son, Mirza Muhammad Riza, began to organize the insurgent effort.  Shirazi then issued a fatwa (religious ruling), pointing out that it was against Islamic law for Muslims to countenance being ruled by non-Muslims, and he called for a jihad against the British. By July 1920, Mosul was in rebellion against British rule, and the insurrection moved south down the Euphrates River valley. The southern tribes, who cherished their long-held political autonomy, needed little inducement to join in the fray. They did not cooperate in an organized effort against the British, however, which limited the effect of the revolt. The country was in a state of anarchy for three months; the British restored order only with reinforcements from India.

The Iraqi revolt of 1920 was a watershed event in contemporary Iraqi history. For the first time, Sunnis and Shias, tribes and cities, were brought together in a common effort. In the opinion of Hanna Batatu, author of a seminal work on Iraq, the building of a nation-state in Iraq depended upon two major factors: the integration of Shias and Sunnis into the new body politic and the successful resolution of the age-old conflicts between the tribes and the riverine cities and among the tribes themselves over the food-producing flatlands of the Tigris and the Euphrates. The 1920 rebellion brought these groups together, if only briefly; this constituted an important first step in the long and arduous process of forging a nation-state out of Iraq's conflict-ridden social structure.The Assyrian Levies, a military force under British command, participated in the Kirkuk Massacre of 1924 of Kurds;Arabs and Turkomen. (See Simele Massacres of 1933)

On 1 October 1922, the Royal Air Force (RAF) elements stationed in Iraq were reorganized into the RAF Iraq Command, which came about partially as a result of the 1920 revolt. This new command was primarily designed to suppress any threats to the Hashemite monarchy. Air control was considered by the British government as a more cost-effective method of controlling large areas of territory than land forces, an idea that was heavily promoted by RAF officer Hugh Trenchard. During the 1920s and 30s, the RAF Iraq Command participated in the suppression of numerous protests and revolts against the Hashemite monarchy.  Historian Elie Kedourie noted that "the North [of Iraq] as a whole had to be coerced [into submission] by the Royal Air Force." When the Kurdish leader Sheikh Mahmud launched an armed rebellion, the British used the newly established Iraqi army to suppress the revolt, but that proved ineffective. The British then resorted to deploying the RAF, which suppressed the revolt. In the same period, rebellions by the Shia in the South were also suppressed by the RAF.

Coronation of Faisal
At the Cairo Conference of March 1921, the British set the parameters for Iraqi political life that were to continue until the 1958 revolution; they chose a Hashemite, Faisal ibn Husayn, son of Sherif Hussein ibn Ali former Sharif of Mecca as Iraq's first King; they established an Iraqi army (but kept Iraq Levies under direct British command); and they proposed a new treaty. To confirm Faisal as Iraq's first monarch, a one-question plebiscite was carefully arranged that had a return of 96 percent in his favor. The British saw in Faisal a leader who possessed sufficient nationalist and Islamic credentials to have broad appeal, but who also was vulnerable enough to remain dependent on their support. Faisal traced his descent from the family of the Prophet Muhammad.  His ancestors held political authority in the holy cities of Mecca and Medina since the 10th century. The British believed these credentials would satisfy traditional Arab standards of political legitimacy; moreover, the British thought Faisal would be accepted by the growing Iraqi nationalist movement because of his role in the 1916 Arab Revolt against the Turks, his achievements as a leader of the Iraq emancipation movement, and his general leadership qualities. Faisal was instated as the Monarch of Iraq after the Naquib of Baghdad was disqualified as being too old (80 yrs) and Sayid Talib (a prominent Iraqi from the province of Basra) was deported on trumped up charges by the British. The voting was far from a reflection of the true feelings of the Iraqi people. Nevertheless, Faisal was considered the most effective choice for the throne by the British government.

The final major decision taken at the Cairo Conference related to the Anglo-Iraqi Treaty of 1922. Faisal was under pressure from the nationalists and the anti-British mujtahids of Najaf and Karbala to limit both British influence in Iraq and the duration of the treaty. Recognizing that the monarchy depended on British support— and wishing to avoid a repetition of his experience in Syria — Faisal maintained a moderate approach in dealing with the UK. The treaty, which had been originally set as a 20-year engagement but later reduced to four years, was ratified in June 1924; it stated that the king would heed British advice on all matters affecting British interests and on fiscal policy as long as Iraq had a balance of payments deficit with the UK, and that British officials would be appointed to specified posts in 18 departments to act as advisers and inspectors. A subsequent financial agreement, which significantly increased the financial burden on Iraq, required Iraq to pay half the cost of supporting British resident officials, among other expenses. British obligations under the new treaty included providing various kinds of aid, notably military assistance, and proposing Iraq for membership in the League of Nations at the earliest moment. In effect, the treaty ensured that Iraq would remain politically and economically dependent on the UK. While unable to prevent the treaty, Faisal clearly felt that the British had gone back on their promises to him.

The British decision at the Cairo Conference to establish an indigenous Iraqi army was significant. In Iraq, as in most of the developing world, the military establishment has been the best organized institution in an otherwise weak political system. Thus, while Iraq's body politic crumbled under immense political and economic pressure throughout the monarchic period, the military gained increasing power and influence; moreover, because the officers in the new army were by necessity Sunnis who had served under the Ottomans, while the lower ranks were predominantly filled by Shia tribal elements, Sunni dominance in the military was preserved.

Later years
The Anglo-Iraqi Treaty of 1930 provided for a "close alliance," for "full and frank consultations between the two countries in all matters of foreign policy," and for mutual assistance in case of war. Iraq granted the British the use of air bases near Basra and at Habbaniyah and the right to move troops across the country. The treaty, of twenty-five years' duration, was to come into force upon Iraq's admission to the League of Nations.

With the signing of the 1930 Treaty and the settling of the Mosul Question, Iraqi politics took on a new dynamic. The emerging class of Sunni and Shia landowning tribal sheikhs vied for positions of power with wealthy and prestigious urban-based Sunni families and with Ottoman-trained army officers and bureaucrats. Because Iraq's newly established political institutions were the creation of a foreign power, and because the concept of democratic government had no precedent in Iraqi history, the politicians in Baghdad lacked legitimacy and never developed deeply rooted constituencies. Thus, despite a constitution and an elected assembly, Iraqi politics was more a shifting alliance of important personalities and cliques than a democracy in the Western sense. The absence of broadly based political institutions inhibited the early nationalist movement's ability to make deep inroads into Iraq's diverse social structure.

The Mandatory administration continued to operate until 1932.

In 1936 and 1937 various protests and revolts broke out against the Iraqi government, with the main issues centering around agrarian issues and conscription into the armed forces. These were suppressed by the Iraqi government with assistance from the RAF Iraq Command, with Kedourie writing that the "killing, it seems, was indiscriminate, and old men, women and children were the victims." An armed revolt which broke out in 1937 over agrarian issues and conscription was also "put down with the help of indiscriminate aerial bombing." During these disturbances, Shia religious leaders were expelled from Iraq due to being Persians. Kedourie describes the monarchy as despotic, with a record "full of bloodshed, treason and rapine" and "however pitiful its end we may know that it was implicit in its beginning."

In his assessment of the British mandate and the Iraqi monarchy, historians Kanan Makiya considers the British mandate and its institutions more as "agents of modernisation" than colonialism:

Kedourie's judgement, however, is different:

If Makiya is referring to economic development in his account of the British modernising legacy in Iraq, an authoritative study demonstrates that Iraq's productivity in agriculture, the most important sector at the time, in fact declined from 275 kg per acre in 1920 to an average of 238 kg per acre between 1953 and 1958.

Under the British mandate a new ruling class of 'government shaikhs' was created. "Many of them [the Shaikhs], reported Major Pulley to the British commissioner in Baghdad in 1920, "were small men of no account until we made them powerful and rich." The Civil Commissioner Wilson reported on his part that the Shaikhs "were in most cases directly dependent on the civil administration for the positions they held; realising that their positions entailed corresponding obligations, they co-operated actively with the political officers."

In a dispatch by a British official to London in 1928, there was a description of how the electoral system worked: the government's provincial governors were in fact election agents who drew up lists of those to be elected and of those who would do the electing. Elections to "the chamber of deputies and appointments to the senate," comments Keeourie, "were an additional weapon in the hands of the 
government wherewith the better to control the country."

Independence
On 3 October 1932, the Hashemite Kingdom of Iraq became a fully-sovereign state. Ruled by the Hashemites, it lasted until 1958.

Economy

Oil concession
Before the collapse of the Ottoman Empire, the British-controlled Turkish Petroleum Company (TPC) had held concessionary rights to the Mosul wilaya (province). Under the 1916 Sykes-Picot Agreement — an agreement in 1916 between Britain and France that delineated future control of the Middle East — the area would have fallen under French influence. In 1919, however, the French relinquished their claims to Mosul under the terms of the Long-Berenger Agreement. The 1919 agreement granted the French a 25 percent share in the TPC as compensation.

Beginning in 1923, British and Iraqi negotiators held acrimonious discussions over the new oil concession. The major obstacle was Iraq's insistence on a 20 percent equity participation in the company; this figure had been included in the original TPC concession to the Turks and had been agreed upon at Sanremo for the Iraqis. In the end, despite strong nationalist sentiments against the concession agreement, the Iraqi negotiators acquiesced to it. The League of Nations was soon to vote on the disposition of Mosul, and the Iraqis feared that, without British support, Iraq would lose the area to Turkey. In March 1925, an agreement was concluded that contained none of the Iraqi demands. The TPC, now renamed the Iraq Petroleum Company (IPC), was granted a full and complete concession for a period of seventy-five years.

British High Commissioners 
 1920–1923: Major-General Sir Percy Cox
 1923–1928: Sir Henry Dobbs
 1928–1929: Brigadier-General Sir Gilbert Clayton
 1929–1932: Lt. Colonel Sir Francis Humphrys

See also
Guardians of Independence
Mesopotamian campaign
Ottoman Iraq
RAF Iraq Command

Notes

Sources

Further reading
 Barker, A. J.: The First Iraq War, 1914-1918: Britain's Mesopotamian Campaign (New York: Enigma Books, 2009). 
 Fuccaro, Nelida: The Other Kurds (London: IB Tauris, 1999).
 Dodge, Toby: Inventing Iraq (2009).
 Fieldhouse, David K.: Western Imperialism in the Middle East, 1914–1958 (2006).
 Fisk, Robert: The Great War for Civilisation: The Conquest of the Middle East, (2nd ed. 2006).
 Jacobsen, Mark: "'Only by the Sword': British Counter‐insurgency in Iraq", in: Small Wars and Insurgencies 2, no. 2 (1991): pp. 323–63.
 Simons, Geoff: Iraq: From Sumer to Saddam (2nd ed. 1994).
 Sluglett, Peter: Britain in Iraq: Contriving King and Country, 1914–1932 (2nd ed. 2007).
 Vinogradov, Amal: "The 1920 Revolt in Iraq Reconsidered: The Role of Tribes in National Politics," International Journal of Middle East Studies 3, no. 2 (1972): pp. 123–39.

 
Mandatory Iraq
British military occupations
Former countries in the Middle East
Iraq–United Kingdom relations
States and territories established in 1920
States and territories disestablished in 1932
Sykes–Picot Agreement
1920 establishments in Iraq
20th-century disestablishments in Iraq
Former countries of the interwar period